Towhid Suri (also Romanized as Towḩīd Sūrī; also known as Towḩīd) is a village in Suri Rural District, Suri District, Rumeshkhan County, Lorestan Province, Iran. At the 2006 census, its population was 148, in 31 families.

References 

Populated places in Rumeshkhan County